Archduke Anton of Austria (Vienna, 20 March 1901 – Salzburg, 22 October 1987) was a possible Carlist pretender to the Spanish throne and an Archduke of Austria by birth. In 1919, all titles of nobility and royalty were prohibited and outlawed in Austria (while in Hungary they were restored in 1927 and the aristocratic House of Magnates continued until 1945). He was the seventh of ten children born to Archduke Leopold Salvator of Austria, Prince of Tuscany and Infanta Blanca of Spain, daughter of Infante Carlos, Duke of Madrid.

Marriage and issue
After being introduced by King Carol II of Romania, he and Princess Ileana of Romania (1909-1991) were married in Sinaia on 26 July 1931.

They had the following children:
Stefan (1932–1998), naturalized US citizen (1954), married Jerrine Soper (1931-2015) in 1954, with issue.
 Maria Ileana (1933–1959), married Count Jaroslav Kottulinsky (1917-1959) in 1957, with issue.
 Alexandra (born 1935), married Eugen Eberhard, Duke of Würtenberg (born 1930) in 1962, divorced in 1972 and annulled at Rome in 1973, with no issue; married Baron Victor von Baillou (born 1931) in 1973, with no issue.
 Dominic von Habsburg (born 1937), married Engel von Voss (1937-2010) in 1960 and divorced in 1999, with issue; married Emmanuella Mlynarski (born 1948) in 1999, with no issue.
 Maria Magdalena (1939-2021), married Baron Hans Ulrich von Holzhausen (born 1929) in 1959, with issue.
 Elisabeth (1942-2019), married Dr. Friedrich Sandhofer (born in 1934) in 1964, with issue.

World War II and later life

In the Second World War, he served until late 1944 in the German Wehrmacht as a pilot. After leaving the military, he moved to Bran, where he and his family lived in the Bran Castle. After the coup d'état, and the end of Romania's alliance with Germany on 23 August 1944, the family and their servants were in danger of being interned or thrown out of the country, as German citizens. It was only when King Michael I abdicated on 30 December 1947 and was forced to leave the country that Archduke Anton's family also went into exile. The family spent some time in Switzerland, then in Argentina, then lived in the early 1950s in the United States.

The marriage ended in divorce, made official on 29 May 1954. While Ileana became a nun, Archduke Anton moved to Austria, where he lived until his death in Emmerberg and in St. Lorenz am Mondsee in the Villa Minola. He died on 22 October 1987 at the age of 86. He was buried at the cemetery on the Mondsee.

Further reading
Lost Waltz A Story Of Exile by Bertita Harding (1944).

Ancestry

References

External links
 Lost Waltz A Story Of Exile by Bertita Harding (free Download)

House of Habsburg-Lorraine
1901 births
1987 deaths
Nobility from Vienna
Luftwaffe personnel of World War II
Navarrese titular monarchs
Carlist pretenders to the Spanish throne